Luis José Oviedo (born May 15, 1999) is a Venezuelan professional baseball pitcher in the Cleveland Guardians organization. He made his Major League Baseball (MLB) debut in 2021 with the Pittsburgh Pirates.

Career

Cleveland Indians
Oviedo signed as an international free agent by the Cleveland Indians on July 2, 2015. In 2019, pitching for the Lake County Captains of the Class A Midwest League, Oviedo had a 5.38 earned run average with 72 strikeouts and 40 walks in 87 innings pitched.

Pittsburgh Pirates
The New York Mets selected Oviedo from the Cleveland Indians in the 2020 Rule 5 draft on December 10, 2020. The same day, the Mets traded Oviedo to the Pittsburgh Pirates in exchange for cash considerations.

Oviedo made the Pirates' Opening Day roster in 2021. On April 3, 2021, Oviedo made his MLB debut, pitching a scoreless inning of relief against the Chicago Cubs, also notching his first MLB strikeout, striking out Ian Happ. Throughout 2021, Oviedo made 22 appearances, going 1–2 with an 8.80 ERA and 31 strikeouts.

On April 21, 2022, Oviedo was designated for assignment by the Pirates.

Cleveland Guardians
Oviedo was claimed off waivers by the Cleveland Guardians on April 26, 2022. The Guardians designated Oviedo for assignment on May 20, 2022. After clearing waivers, Oviedo was outrighted to the minor leagues on May 22, 2022.

See also
Rule 5 draft results

References

External links

Living people
1999 births
Sportspeople from Barquisimeto
Major League Baseball players from Venezuela
Venezuelan expatriate baseball players in the United States
Major League Baseball pitchers
Pittsburgh Pirates players
Dominican Summer League Indians players
Venezuelan expatriate baseball players in the Dominican Republic
Arizona League Indians players
Mahoning Valley Scrappers players
Lake County Captains players
Cardenales de Lara players
Bradenton Marauders players
Indianapolis Indians players
Altoona Curve players